Asaşspor 1972 is a football club located in İskenderun near Hatay, southern Turkey. The team competes in Hatay Amateur Leagues.

League participations
Turkish Regional Amateur League: 2011–2012
Hatay Amateur Leagues: 2012–present

League performances

Source: TFF: Asaşspor 1972

References

External links 
Asaşspor 1972 on TFF.org

Football clubs in Hatay